Carla Sofia Basilio Couto is a Portuguese former football striker who played for several clubs in the Campeonato Nacional de Futebol Feminino. In season 2011–12 she represented SS Lazio in Italy's Serie A.

A member of the Portugal national team since 1993, Couto retired from the national team in July 2012. She scored 29 goals in her record 145 caps.

Couto retired from football in 2014, after two seasons with Valadares Gaia. She spent a total of 14 years with 1º Dezembro and won 11 League titles and six Portuguese Women's Cups.

References

External links

Profile at Portal Futebol Feminino em Portugal (Portuguese)

1974 births
Living people
Portuguese women's footballers
Expatriate women's footballers in Italy
Expatriate women's footballers in China
Portuguese expatriates in Italy
Portuguese expatriates in China
FIFA Century Club
Serie A (women's football) players
S.S. Lazio Women 2015 players
Portugal women's international footballers
Footballers from Lisbon
Women's association football forwards
Campeonato Nacional de Futebol Feminino players
Sporting CP (women's football) players
S.U. 1º Dezembro (women) players
Valadares Gaia F.C. (women) players